The Ottoman dynasty consisted of the members of the imperial House of Osman, also known as the Ottomans. According to Ottoman tradition, the family originated from the Kayı tribe branch of the Oghuz Turks, under Osman I in northwestern Anatolia in the district of Bilecik Söğüt. The Ottoman dynasty, named after Osman I, ruled the Ottoman Empire from c. 1299 to 1922.

During much of the Empire's history, the sultan was the absolute regent, head of state, and head of government, though much of the power often shifted to other officials such as the Grand Vizier. During the First (1876–78) and Second Constitutional Eras (1908–20) of the late Empire, a shift to a constitutional monarchy was enacted, with the Grand Vizier taking on a prime ministerial role as head of government and heading an elected General Assembly.

The imperial family was deposed from power and the sultanate was abolished on 1 November 1922 during the Turkish War of Independence. The Republic of Turkey was declared the following year. The living members of the dynasty were initially sent into exile as personae non-gratae, though some have been allowed to return and live as private citizens in Turkey. In its current form, the family is known as the Osmanoğlu family.

History
The Ottoman dynasty operated under several basic premises: that the Sultan governed the empire's entire territory, that every male member of the dynastic family was hypothetically eligible to become Sultan, and that only one person at a time could be the Sultan. Such rules were fairly standard for monarchic empires of the time. The certain processes through which men rose to the Sultanate, however, were very specific to the Ottoman Empire. To go into greater detail about these processes, the history of succession between Sultans can be divided into two eras: the period between the reign of Orhan (1323–1362), the first person to inherit the Ottoman sultanate, and the reign of Ahmed I (1603–1617); and the period following Ahmed I's reign.

The succession process during the first period was dominated by violence and intra-familial conflict, in which the various sons of the deceased Sultan fought until only one remained alive and, thus, inherited the throne. This tradition was known as fratricide in the Ottoman Empire but may have evolved from tanistry, a similar succession procedure that existed in many Turco-Mongolian dynasties predating the Ottomans. Sons of the Sultan were often given provincial territories to govern until the Sultan's death, at which point they would each vie for the throne. Each son had to, according to historian H. Erdem Cipa, "demonstrate that his fortune was superior to the fortunes of his rivals", a demonstration that often took the form of military accomplishment and ruthlessness. This violence was not considered particularly unexpected or unusual. As Cipa has noted, the Ottoman words for "successor" and "conflict" share the same Arabic root, and indeed, all but one of the successions in this roughly 200-year period involved a resolution by combat. Over time, the combat became increasingly prevalent and recognized, especially after a Jannissary uprising negated Murad II's attempt to abdicate the throne peacefully to his son, Mehmed II, in 1444. During the eventual reign of Mehmed II (1451–1481), fratricide was legalized as an official practice; during the reign of Bayezid II (1481–1512), fratricide between Bayezid II's sons occurred before Bayezid II himself died; and after the reign of Murad III (1574–1595), his successor Mehmed III executed 19 brothers to claim the throne.

During the second period, the tradition of fratricide was replaced by a simpler and less violent procedure. Starting with the succession from Ahmed I to Mustafa I in 1617, the Ottoman throne was inherited by the eldest male blood relative – not necessarily the son – of the Sultan, regardless of how many eligible family members were alive. The change in succession procedure was likely instigated by numerous factors, including fratricide’s decline in popularity among Ottoman elites and Ahmed I’s decision not to kill Mustafa when inheriting the throne from Mehmed III in 1603. With the door open for a policy change, a political debate arose between those who supported unrestricted Sultanic privilege and those who supported a stronger, centralized law system that would supersede even the Sultan’s power to an extent. Historian Baki Tezcan has argued that the latter faction – with the help of the influential şeyhülislam Hocazade Esad Efendi – was able to prevail in this instance. The bloodless succession from Ahmed I to Mustafa I in 1617 "provided a reference for the eventual stabilization of the rule of Ottoman succession, the very regulation of which by an outside force was in effect a constitutional check on the dynastic prerogative," Tezcan has written. The precedent set in 1617 stuck, as the eldest living family member successfully inherited the throne in each of the following 21 successions, with relatively few instances of a son inheriting the throne.

Succession practices

From the fourteenth through the late sixteenth centuries, the Ottomans practiced open succession – something historian Donald Quataert has described as "survival of the fittest, not eldest, son." During their father's lifetime, all adult sons of the reigning Osmanoğlu family's sultan were given provincial governorships in order to gain experience in administration (a practice commonly found in Central Asian tradition), accompanied and mentored by their retinues and tutors. Upon the death of their father, the reigning sultan, these sons would fight amongst themselves for the succession until one emerged triumphant. The first son to reach the capital and seize control of the court would usually become the new ruler. The proximity of a Şehzade (=Prince) to Constantinople improved his chances of success, simply because he could hear of his father's death, seize control of the Ottoman court in the capital, and declare himself Sultan first. A Sultan could thus hint at his preferred successor by giving a favourite son a closer governorship. Bayezid II, for instance, had to fight his brother Cem Sultan in the 1480s for the right to rule.

Occasionally, the half-brothers would begin the struggle even before the death of their father. Under Suleiman the Magnificent (1520–1566), strife between his sons Şehzade Mustafa and Şehzade Selim (later Selim II) caused such internal turmoil that Suleiman ordered the deaths of both Şehzade Mustafa and another son, Şehzade Bayezid, leaving Şehzade Selim the sole heir.

During the reigns of Suleiman I and Selim II, the Haseki Sultan (Ottoman Turkish: خاصکى سلطان) or chief consort rose to greater prominence. Gaining power within the Imperial Harem, the favourite was able to manoeuvre to ensure the succession for one of her sons. This led to a short period of effective primogeniture. However, unlike in the earlier period, when the sultan had already defeated his brothers and potential rivals for the throne in battle, these sultans had the problem of many half-brothers who could act as the focus for rival factions. Thus, to prevent attempts at seizing the throne, reigning sultans practiced fratricide upon accession, starting with Murad I in 1362. Both Murad III and his son Mehmed III had their half-brothers murdered. The killing of all the new sultan's brothers and half-brothers (who were usually quite numerous) was traditionally done by manual strangling with a silk cord. As the centuries passed, the ritual killing was gradually replaced by lifetime solitary confinement in the "Golden Cage" or kafes, a room in the harem from where the sultan's brothers could never escape, unless perchance they became heir presumptive. Some had already become mentally unstable by the time they were asked to reign.

Mehmed III was the last sultan to have previously held a provincial governorship. Sons now remained within the harem until the death of their father. This not only denied them the ability to form powerful factions capable of usurping their father but also denied them the opportunity to have children while their father remained alive. Thus, when Mehmet's son came to the throne as Ahmed I, he had no children of his own. Moreover, as a minor, there was no evidence he could have children. This had the potential to create a crisis of succession and led to a gradual end to fratricide. Ahmed had some of his brothers killed, but not Mustafa (later Mustafa I). Similarly, Osman II allowed his half-brothers Murad IV and Ibrahim to live. This led to a shift in the 17th century from a system of primogeniture to one based on agnatic seniority, in which the eldest male within the dynasty succeeded, also to guarantee adult sultans and prevent both fratricides as well as the sultanate of women. Thus, Mustafa succeeded his brother Ahmed; Suleiman II and Ahmed II succeeded their brother Mehmed IV before being succeeded in turn by Mehmed's son Mustafa II. Agnatic seniority explains why from the 17th century onwards a deceased sultan was rarely succeeded by his son, but usually by an uncle or brother. It also meant that potential rulers had to wait a long time in the kafes before ascending the throne, hence the old age of certain sultans upon their enthronement. Although attempts were made in the 19th century to replace agnatic seniority with primogeniture, they were unsuccessful, and seniority was retained until the abolition of the sultanate in 1922.

Chronology of sultans 

{| class="wikitable collapsible collapsed" border="1" style="width:100%; text-align:center;"
!The genealogy of the Ottoman Sultans including their mothers
|-
|

List of heirs since 1922
The Ottoman dynasty was expelled from Turkey in 1924 and most members took on the surname Osmanoğlu, meaning "son of Osman." The female members of the dynasty were allowed to return after 1951, and the male members after 1973. Below is a list of people who would have been heirs to the Ottoman throne following the abolition of the sultanate on 1 November 1922. These people have not necessarily made any claim to the throne; for example, Ertuğrul Osman said "Democracy works well in Turkey."

Family tree, showing relationships among the heads of the Ottoman dynasty

 Mahmud II (1785–1839; 30th Sultan and 23rd Ottoman Caliph: 1808–1839)
 Abdulmejid I (1823–1861; 31st Sultan and 24th Ottoman Caliph: 1839–1861)
 Murad V (1840–1904; 33rd Sultan and 26th Ottoman Caliph: 1876)
 Şehzade Mehmed Selaheddin (1861–1915)
Ahmed Nihad (1883–1954; 38th Head of the House of Osman: 1944–1954)
 Ali Vâsib (1903–1983; 41st Head of the House of Osman: 1977–1983)
 Osman Fuad (1895–1973; 39th Head of the House of Osman: 1954–1973)
 Abdul Hamid II (1842–1918; 34th Sultan and 27th Ottoman Caliph: 1876–1909)
Şehzade Mehmed Selim (1870–1937)
 Şehzade Mehmed Abdülkerim (1906–1935)
Dündar Ali Osman (1930–2021): 45th Head of the House of Osman: 2017–2021)
Harun Osman (born 1932): 46th Head of the House of Osman: (2021–present)
Şehzade Mehmed Abdülkadir (1878–1944)
Mehmed Orhan (1909–1994; 42nd Head of the House of Osman: 1983–1994)
 Şehzade Mehmed Burhaneddin (1885–1949)
 Ertuğrul Osman (1912–2009; 43rd Head of the House of Osman: 1994–2009)
 Mehmed V (1844–1918; 35th Sultan and 28th Ottoman Caliph: 1909–1918)
Şehzade Mehmed Burhaneddin (1849–1876)
 Şehzade Ibrahim Tevfik (1874–1931)
 Bayezid Osman (1924–2017; 44th Head of the House of Osman: 2009–2017)
  Mehmed VI Vahideddin (1861–1926; 36th and last Sultan and 29th Ottoman Caliph: 1918–1922; 36th Head of the House of Osman: 1922–1926)
  Abdulaziz (1830–1876; 32nd Sultan and 25th Ottoman Caliph: 1861–1876)
Abdulmejid II (1868–1944; 30th and last Ottoman Caliph: 1922–1924; 37th Head of the House of Osman: 1926–1944)
 Şehzade Mehmed Seyfeddin (1874–1927)
 Mehmed Abdulaziz (1901–1977; 40th Head of the House of Osman: 1973–1977)

Line of succession in November 1922

 Mahmud II (1785–1839; 30th Sultan and 23rd Ottoman Caliph: 1808–1839)
 Abdulmejid I (1823–1861; 31st Sultan and 24th Ottoman Caliph: 1839–1861)
 Murad V (1840–1904; 33rd Sultan and 26th Ottoman Caliph: 1876)
 Şehzade Mehmed Selaheddin (1861–1915)
(8) Şehzade Ahmed Nihad (born 6 July 1883)
(19) Şehzade Ali Vâsib (born 14 October 1903)
(14) Şehzade Osman Fuad (born 26 September 1895)
 Abdul Hamid II (1842–1918; 34th Sultan and 27th Ottoman Caliph: 1876–1909)
(2) Şehzade Mehmed Selim (born 11 January 1870)
(23) Şehzade Mehmed Abdülkerim (born 27 June 1906)
(6) Şehzade Mehmed Abdülkadir (born 16 January 1878)
(25) Şehzade Mehmed Orhan (born 11 July 1909)
(32) Şehzade Necib Ertuğrul (born 1914 (or 27 March 1915) 
(34) Şehzade Alaeddin Kadir (born 2 January 1917) 
(7) Şehzade Ahmed Nuri (born 12 February 1878)
(9) Şehzade Mehmed Burhaneddin (born 19 December 1885)
(27) Şehzade Mehmed Fahreddin (born 14 November 1911) 
(28) Şehzade Ertuğrul Osman Efendi (born 18 August 1912)
(12) Şehzade Abdurrahim Hayri (born 15 August 1894)
(16) Şehzade Ahmed Nureddin (born 22 June 1901)
(22) Şehzade Mehmed Abid (born 17 September 1905) 
 Mehmed V Reşâd (1844–1918; 35th Sultan and 28th Ottoman Caliph: 1909–1918)
(3) Şehzade Mehmed Ziyaeddin (born 26 August 1873)
(26) Şehzade Mehmed Nazım (born 26 October 1910) 
(30) Şehzade Ömer Fevzi (born 13 November 1912)
(10) Şehzade Ömer Hilmi (born 2 March 1888)
(31) Şehzade Mahmud Namık  (born 1913 (or 25 February 1914)
Şehzade Mehmed Burhaneddin (1849–1876)
(5) Şehzade Ibrahim Tevfik (born 25 September 1874)
(36) Şehzade Burhaneddin Cem (born 1920)
Şehzade Selim Süleyman (1860–1909)
(13) Şehzade Mehmed Abdülhalim (born 28 September 1894)
(20) Şehzade Mehmed Şerafeddin (born 19 May 1904) 
  Mehmed VI Vahideddin (born 2 February 1861)
(29) Şehzade Mehmed Ertuğrul (born 10 September 1912) 
  Abdulaziz (1830–1876; 32nd Sultan and 25th Ottoman Caliph: 1861–1876)
Şehzade Yusuf Izzeddin (1857–1916)
(24) Şehzade Mehmed Nizameddin (born 18 December 1908) 
(1) Abdulmejid II (born 29 May 1868)
(15) Şehzade Ömer Faruk (born 29 February 1898) 
Şehzade Mehmed Şevket (1872–1899) 
(11) Şehzade Mehmed Cemaleddin (born 1 March 1891) 
(33) Şehzade Mahmud Hüsameddin (born 25 August 1916) 
(35) Şehzade Süleyman Sadeddin (born 20 November 1917)
(4) Şehzade Mehmed Seyfeddin (born 22 September 1874)
(17) Şehzade Mehmed Abdulaziz (born 26 September 1901) 
(18) Şehzade Mahmud Şevket (born 30 July 1903) 
(21) Şehzade Ahmed Tevhid (born 2 December 1904)

See also
 Simplified Ottoman Emperors family tree
 Detailed Ottoman Emperors family tree
 Turkic History
 List of Turkic dynasties and countries
 Amuca tribe
 Osmanoğlu family, its current form
 List of admirals in the Ottoman Empire
 List of sultans of the Ottoman Empire
 List of Ottoman imperial consorts
 List of mothers of the Ottoman sultans
 List of Valide Hatun
 List of Valide Sultan
 List of Ottoman princesses
 List of Ottoman Grand Viziers
 List of Kapudan Pashas
 Tuğra-Sultan's Signature
 Ottoman Empire
 Kadın (title)

Notes

References

External links

In English
Official website of the immediate living descendants of the Ottoman dynasty
Everything about Ottoman Empire Everything about the history, culture and civilization of Ottoman Empire
Ottoman Empire – The Family

In Turkish
Osmanlı Hanedanlığı, Ottoman dynasty
Osmanlı Sultanları
Tarihvemedeniyet.org

In French

|-

|-

|-

 
Line of succession
Line of succession
1281 establishments in Europe
1281 establishments in Asia
Maturidis